In the world of sports, "friendly games" may refer to:
The Commonwealth Games, commonly referred to as the Friendly Games
Any form of exhibition game